Richard Freiherr von Krafft-Ebing (full name Richard Fridolin Joseph Freiherr Krafft von Festenberg auf Frohnberg, genannt von Ebing; 14 August 1840 – 22 December 1902) was a German psychiatrist and author of the foundational work Psychopathia Sexualis (1886).

Life
Krafft-Ebing was born on 14 August 1840 in Mannheim, Germany. He studied medicine at the University of Heidelberg, where he specialized in psychiatry. He later practised in psychiatric asylums.  After leaving his work in asylums, he pursued a career in psychiatry, forensics, and hypnosis.

He died in Graz on 22 December 1902. He was recognised as an authority on deviant sexual behaviour and its medico-legal aspects.

Principal work

Krafft-Ebing's principal work is Psychopathia Sexualis: eine Klinisch-Forensische Studie (Sexual Psychopathy: A Clinical-Forensic Study), which was first published in 1886 and expanded in subsequent editions. The last edition from the hand of the author (the twelfth) contained a total of 238 case histories of human sexual behaviour.

Translations of various editions of this book introduced to English such terms as "sadist" (derived from the brutal sexual practices depicted in the novels of the Marquis de Sade), "masochist", (derived from the name of Leopold von Sacher-Masoch), "homosexuality", "bisexuality", "necrophilia", and "anilingus".

Psychopathia Sexualis is a forensic reference book for psychiatrists, physicians, and judges. Written in an academic style, its introduction noted that, to discourage lay readers, the author had deliberately chosen a scientific term for the title of the book and that he had written parts of it in Latin for the same purpose.

Psychopathia Sexualis was one of the first books about sexual practices that studied homosexuality/bisexuality. It proposed consideration of the mental state of sex criminals in legal judgements of their crimes. During its time, it became the leading medico-legal textual authority on sexual pathology.

The twelfth and final edition of Psychopathia Sexualis presented four categories of what Krafft-Ebing called "cerebral neuroses":

paradoxia, sexual excitement occurring independently of the period of the physiological processes in the generative organs
anaesthesia, absence of sexual instinct
hyperaesthesia, increased desire, satyriasis
paraesthesia, perversion of the sexual instinct, i.e., excitability of the sexual functions  to inadequate stimuli

Krafft-Ebing considered procreation the purpose of sexual desire and that any form of recreational sex was a perversion of the sex drive. "With opportunity for the natural satisfaction of the sexual instinct, every expression of it that does not correspond with the purpose of naturei.e., propagation,must be regarded as perverse." Hence, he concluded that homosexuals suffered a degree of sexual perversion because homosexual practices could not result in procreation. In some cases, homosexual libido was classified as a moral vice induced by the early practice of masturbation. Krafft-Ebing proposed a theory of homosexuality as biologically anomalous and originating in the embryonic and fetal stages of gestation, which evolved into a "sexual inversion" of the brain. In 1901, in an article in the Jahrbuch für sexuelle Zwischenstufen (Yearbook for Intermediate Sexual Types), he changed the biological term from anomaly to differentiation.

Although the primary focus is on sexual behaviour in men, there are sections on Sadism in Woman, Masochism in Woman, and Lesbian Love. Several of the cases of sexual activity with children were committed by women.

Krafft-Ebing’s conclusions about homosexuality are now largely forgotten, partly because Sigmund Freud’s theories were more interesting to physicians (who considered homosexuality to be a psychological problem) and partly because he incurred the enmity of the Austrian Catholic Church when he psychologically associated martyrdom (a desire for sanctity) with hysteria and masochism.

The term "hetero-sexual" is used, but not in chapter or section headings. The term "bi-sexuality" appears twice in the 7th edition, and more frequently in the 12th.

There is no mention of sexual activity with children in Chapter III, General Pathology, where the "cerebral neuroses" (including sexuality the paraesthesias) are covered. Various sexual acts with children are mentioned in Chapter IV, Special Pathology, but always in the context of specific mental disorders, such as dementia, epilepsy, and paranoia, never as resulting from its own disorder. However, Chapter V on sexual crimes has a section on sexual crimes with children. This section is brief in the 7th edition, but is expanded in the 12th to cover Non-Psychopathological Cases and Psychopathological Cases, in which latter subsection the term paedophilia erotica is used.

Works

A bibliography of von Krafft-Ebing's writings can be found in A. Kreuter, Deutschsprachige Neurologen und Psychiater, München 1996, Band 2, pp. 767-774.

 Die Melancholie: Eine klinische Studie (1874) 
 Grundzüge der Kriminalpsychologie für Juristen (second edition, 1882) 
Psychopathia Sexualis: eine Klinisch-Forensische Studie (first edition, 1886)
 Die progressive allgemeine Paralyse (1894) 
 Nervosität und neurasthenische Zustände (1895)

Translations
 Domino Falls translated and edited Psychopathia Sexualis:The Case Histories (1997) 
 Charles Gilbert Chaddock translated four of Krafft-Ebing's books into English:
 An Experimental Study in the Domain of Hypnotism (New York and London, 1889)
 Psychosis Menstrualis (1902)
 Psychopathia Sexualis (twelfth edition, 1903)
 Text-Book of Insanity (1905)

See also

 Paraphilia
 Sexual fetishism
 Sexology

References

Sources

Bibliography 
 Heinrich Ammerer. "Am Anfang war die Perversion." Richard von Krafft-Ebing, Psychiater und Pionier der modernen Sexualkunde. Vienna: Verlagsgruppe Styria, 2011. .
 Psychopathia Sexualis (1886). Reprint, Burbank, CA: Bloat, 1999. 
 Harry Oosterhuis. Stepchildren of Nature: Krafft-Ebing, Psychiatry, and the Making of Sexual Identity. Chicago: University of Chicago Press, 2000. 
 Gordene Olga Mackenzie. Transgender Nation. Madison: University of Wisconsin Press, 1994. 
 Jörg Hutter. "Richard von Krafft-Ebing", in Homosexualität. Handbuch der Theorie- und Forschungsgeschichte, pp. 48–54. Ed. Rüdiger Lautmann. Frankfurt am Main: Campus, 1993. 
 John K. Noyes. The Mastery of Submission. Inventions of Masochism. Ithaca: Cornell University Press, 1997. 
 Rainer Krafft-Ebing, ed. Richard Freiherr von Krafft-Ebing. Eine Studienreise durch Südeuropa 1869/70. Graz: Leykam Buchverlag, 2000. 
 Peter Weibel, ed. Phantom of Desire, Visions of Masochism. Essays and Texts, pp. 36–38. Graz: Neue Galerie am Landesmuseum Joanneum. 
Paolo Savoia. "Sexual Science and Self-Narrative: Epistemology and Narrative Technologies of the Self between Krafft-Ebing and Freud," History of the Human Sciences, 23 (5), 2010.

External links

 
 
 Psychopathia Sexualis, with Especial Reference to the Antipathic Sexual Instinct: A Medico-Forensic Study by Richard Krafft-Ebing, translated by F. J. Rebman, Rebman Company (New York, New York), undated. (translation of 12th German edition)
 Text-book of Insanity, Based on Clinical Observations for Practitioners and Students of Medicine, by Richard Krafft-Ebing, translated by Charles Gilbert Chaddock 1904
 Psychopathia Sexualis with Especial Reference to Contrary Sexual Instinct: A Medico-Legal Study by Richard Krafft-Ebing, translated by Charles Gilbert Chaddock, F.A. Davis Company, 1894 (translation of 7th German edition)

1840 births
1902 deaths
Barons of Austria
Austrian psychiatrists
German psychiatrists
Austrian sexologists
German sexologists
Psychiatry writers on LGBT topics
History of psychiatry
19th-century Austrian writers
19th-century German writers
19th-century German male writers
Heidelberg University alumni